Seki is a village in Ilgaz District, Çankırı Province, Turkey. Its population is 65 (2022). It is 63 km from Çankırı and 10 km from Ilgaz town.

Population

References

Villages in Ilgaz District